is a passenger railway station located in the city of Nishitōkyō, Tokyo, Japan, operated by the private railway operator Seibu Railway.

Lines

Station layout

The station has two elevated island platforms serving four tracks.

Platforms

History
It gained its current name on May 1, 1959, following the construction of the Hibarigaoka Housing Estate nearby.

Station numbering was introduced on all Seibu Railway lines during fiscal 2012, with Hibarigaoka Station becoming "SI13".

Passenger statistics
In fiscal 2019, the station was the 12th busiest on the Seibu network with an average of 74,392 passengers daily.  

The passenger figures for previous years are as shown below.

Surrounding area

See also
 Hibarigaoka Station (Hokkaido), a station in Hokkaido with the same name
 List of railway stations in Japan

References

External links

 Hibarigaoka Station information (Seibu Railway) 

Railway stations in Japan opened in 1924
Seibu Ikebukuro Line
Railway stations in Tokyo
Stations of Seibu Railway
Nishitōkyō, Tokyo